This is the results breakdown of the local elections held in Galicia on 25 May 2003. The following tables show detailed results in the autonomous community's most populous municipalities, sorted alphabetically.

Overall

City control
The following table lists party control in the most populous municipalities, including provincial capitals (shown in bold). Gains for a party are displayed with the cell's background shaded in that party's colour.

Municipalities

A Coruña
Population: 242,458

Ferrol
Population: 79,520

Lugo
Population: 89,509

Ourense
Population: 109,011

Pontevedra
Population: 76,798

Santiago de Compostela
Population: 93,273

Vigo
Population: 288,324

References

Galicia
2003